Primero may refer to:

Primero, a 16th-century gambling card game
Primero River, a river in Cordoba, Argentina
Primero, Colorado, a ghost town
Primero (Ponce), a barrio in the municipality of Ponce, Puerto Rico